The Mullewa–Meekatharra railway was a section of the Northern Railway in Western Australia.

Branch lines
The Cue to Big Bell and Mount Magnet to Sandstone were branch railways that connected with this railway.

The Meekatharra to Wiluna railway was an extension of the line in operation between 1932 and 1957.

As part of the Northern Line

The Mullewa station was connected to both Geraldton and to Perth, and Meekatharra was not the final location of the line, but Wiluna – further east.

Conditions
The Mullewa to Meekatharra line was regularly affected by washaways during wet weather.

Closure
The Mullewa to Meekatharra line was closed on 1 May 1978.

Sections
Mullewa to Meekatharra line sections:

 Mullewa, opened 1894 – 
 Mullewa – Pindar – opened 1 July 1898 – closed November 1996
 Pindar – Cue – opened 1 July 1898 – closed 29 April 1978
 Mount Magnet – junction with Sandstone Branch Railway – 1 August 1910 – closed 28 May 1949
 Cue – Nannine – opened 1 June 1903 – closed 29 April 1978
 Cue –  branch line to Big Bell, Western Australia – opened 2 August 1938 – closed 1 January 1956
 Nannine – Meekatharra – opened 11 August 1910 – closed 29 April 1978
 Meekatharra – continued to Wiluna Branch Railway – opened 2 November 1932 – closed 5 August 1957

See also
 Western Australian Government Railways
 Rail transport in Western Australia
 Midland Railway Company of Western Australia

Notes

External links 
 http://heritage.wa.gov.au/register/PDF_Files/R%20-%20A-D/13253%20RwCottBluffPt(P-AD).PDF

Further reading

 
 
 Quinlan, Howard & Newland, John R.  Australian Railway Routes 1854–2000  2000. 

Closed railway lines in Western Australia
Mid West (Western Australia)
Railway lines opened in 1910
Railway lines closed in 1978